Several species of heavy-bodied cyprinid fishes are collectively known in the United States as Asian carp. Cyprinids from the Indian subcontinent—for example, catla (Catla catla) and mrigal (Cirrhinus cirrhosus)—are not included in this classification and are known collectively as "Indian carp". Asian carp are considered invasive species in the United States.

Species
Ten Asian carp have been substantially introduced outside their native ranges:
 Grass carp (Ctenopharyngodon idella)
 Common carp (Cyprinus carpio)
 Amur carp (Cyprinus rubrofuscus)
 Silver carp (Hypophthalmichthys molitrix)
 Largescale silver carp (Hypophthalmichthys harmandi)
 Bighead carp (Hypophthalmichthys nobilis)
 Black carp (Mylopharyngodon piceus)
 Goldfish  (Carassius auratus)
 Crucian carp (Carassius carassius)
 Mud carp (Cirrhinus molitorella)

All the above, except largescale silver carp, have been cultivated in aquaculture in China for over 1,000 years. Largescale silver carp, a more southern species, is native to Vietnam and is cultivated there. Grass, silver, bighead, and black carp are known as the "Four Domesticated Fish" in China and are the most important freshwater fish species for food and traditional Chinese medicine.  Bighead and silver carp are the most important fish, worldwide, in terms of total aquaculture production. Common carp, amur carp and crucian carp are also common food fishes in China and elsewhere. Goldfish, though, are cultivated mainly as pet fish.  Common carp are native to both Eastern Europe and Western Asia, so they are sometimes called a "Eurasian" carp.

In Chinese culture

A long tradition of Asian carp exists in Chinese culture and literature.  A popular lyric circulating as early as 2,000 years ago in the late Han period includes an anecdote which relates how a man far away from home sent back to his wife a pair of carp, in which, when the wife opened the fish to cook, she found a silk strip that carried a love note of just two lines: "Eat well to keep fit, missing you and forget me not".

At the Yellow River at Henan (Chinese: 河南; pinyin: Hénán; Wade–Giles: Ho-nan) is a waterfall called the Dragon Gate. It is said that if certain carp called yulong can climb the cataract, they will transform into dragons. Every year in the third month of spring, they swim up from the sea and gather in vast numbers in the pool at the foot of the falls. It used to be said that only 71 could make the climb in any year. When the first succeeded, then the rains would begin to fall. This Dragon Gate was said to have been created after the flood by the god-emperor Yu, who split a mountain blocking the path of the Yellow River. It was so famous that throughout China was a common saying, "a student facing his examinations is like a carp attempting to leap the Dragon Gate."

Henan is not the only place where this happens. Many other waterfalls in China also have the name Dragon Gate and much the same is said about them. Other famous Dragon Gates are on the Wei River where it passes through the Lung Sheu Mountains and at Tsin in Shanxi Province.

The fish's jumping feature is set in such a proverbial idiom as "Liyu (Carp) jumps over the Dragon Gate," an idiom that conveys a vivid image symbolizing a sudden uplifting in one's social status, as when one ascends into the upper society or has found favor with the royal or a noble family, perhaps through marriage, but in particular through success in the imperial examination.  It is therefore an idiom often used to encourage students or children to achieve success through hard work and perseverance.   This symbolic image, as well as the image of the carp itself, has been one of the most popular themes in Chinese paintings, especially those of popular styles. The fish is usually colored in gold or pink, shimmering with an unmistakably auspicious tone. Yuquan (玉泉 in Chinese), one of the well-known scenic spots in Hangzhou, has a large fish pond alive with hundreds of carp of various colors.  A three-character inscription, Yu-Le-Guo (鱼乐国), meaning "fish's paradise", is set above one end of the pond in the calligraphy of a famous gentry-scholar of the late Ming Dynasty named Dong Qichang.  Many tourists feed the fish with bread crumbs.

Among the various kinds of carp, the silver carp is the least expensive in China. The grass carp is still the main delicacy in Hangzhou cuisine. Restaurants along the West Lake of the city keep the fish in cages submerged in the lake water right in front of the restaurant; on an order from a customer, they dash a live fish on the pavement to kill it before cooking. The fish is normally served with a vinegar-based sweet-and-sour sauce.

Jumping ability
Silver carp are easily frightened by boats, which cause them to leap up to  into the air, and numerous boaters have been severely injured by collisions with the fish. According to the Environmental Protection Agency, "reported injuries include cuts from fins, black eyes, broken bones, back injuries, and concussions". This behavior has sometimes been attributed to the very similar bighead carp, but these do not normally jump when frightened. Catching jumping carp in nets has become part of the Redneck Fishing Tournament in Bath, Illinois.

As food 

Asian carp have been a popular food fish in Asia for thousands of years. Some recipes are specifically for carp such as the "sweet-and-sour carp" and "thick miso soup with carp". However, many people in North America do not distinguish the various Asian carp species and see them all as undesirable trash fish because of their perceived bottom-feeding behavior, while, in fact, only some species are bottom-feeders. Furthermore, even the bottom-feeding species such as the common carp, a highly bony species which was introduced to North America from Europe in the 17th century, are important food fish outside North America.

The pearly white flesh of carps — though complicated by a series of fine bones — is said to taste like cod or described as a cross between scallops and crabmeat. The filter-feeding silver and bighead carp, in particular, have much lower heavy metal contamination (such as mercury) than most other fish because they are algivorous primary consumers that do not eat other aquatic invertebrates or fishes and therefore are the least impacted by biomagnification.

Copi renaming 
In June 2022, the Illinois Department of Natural Resources announced a campaign to rebrand Asian carp as Copi. The Copi renaming is a part of a Federal and state initiative to get the public to eat the invasive fish, decrease its numbers in Midwestern waterways, and prevent its introduction to the Great Lakes.

The United States Environmental Protection Agency#Environmental Protection Agency (EPA)'s Great Lakes Restoration Initiative (GLRI) is funding the Copi rebrand of Asian carp.

Copi is available in restaurants in Illinois, Arizona and Washington, DC.; in 7 fish markets in Illinois and Tennessee; and through 7 fish distributors in Illinois, Michigan, New York, Ohio, Maryland and Wisconsin. Success of the Copi rebrand of the invasive fish will be measured using pounds of removal as the key metric. Removal was projected to total 6,000,000 lbs at launch of the Copi rebrand, and increase to 12,000,000 in the first year following. Removal at 2 months from launch exceeded 10,000,000 lbs, on pace to beat year 1 projections.

As an invasive species
Some species of Asian carp cause harm when they are introduced to new environments. The black carp feeds on native mussels and snails, some of which can be already endangered. Grass carp can alter the food webs of a new environment by altering the communities of plants, invertebrates, and fish. Silver carp feed on the plankton necessary for larval fish and native mussels.

North America

Because of their prominence, and because they were imported to the United States much later than other carp native to Asia, the term "Asian carp" is often used with the intended meaning of only grass, black, silver, and bighead carp. In the U.S., Asian carp are considered to be invasive species. Of the Asian carp introduced to the United States, only two (crucian and black carp) are not known to be firmly established. Crucian carp is probably extirpated. Since 2003, however, several adults, fertile black carp have been captured from the Atchafalaya and other rivers connected to the Mississippi River. Dr. Leo Nico, in the book Black carp: Biological Synopsis and Risk Assessment of an Introduced Fish, reports that black carp are probably established in the United States. In South Florida, the local water management district actually stocks the canals with sterilized grass carp to control the hydrilla plant, which tends to block the locks and drainage valves used to control water flow from the Everglades.

Bighead and silver carp feed by filtering plankton from the water.  The extremely high abundance of bighead and silver carp has caused great concern because of the potential for competition with native species for food and living space. Because of their filter-feeding habits, they are difficult to capture by normal angling methods.

History
In the late 19th century, the common carp was distributed widely throughout the United States by the United States Fish Commission as a foodfish. 
In the 1970s, fish farmers in mostly southern states began importing Asian carp from China to help clean their commercial ponds. The rise in the populations of bighead and silver carp has been dramatic where they are established in the Mississippi River basin.

Distribution
Bighead, silver, and grass carp are known to be well-established in the Mississippi River basin (including tributaries), where they at times reach extremely high numbers, especially in the case of the bighead and silver carp. Bighead, silver, and grass carp have been captured in that watershed from Louisiana to South Dakota, Minnesota, and Ohio. Grass carp are also established in at least one other watershed, in Texas, and may be established elsewhere.

Grass carp have been captured in all of the Great Lakes except Lake Superior, but so far, no evidence indicates a reproducing population. No silver carp or black carp have yet been found in any of the Great Lakes.  Common carp are abundant throughout the Great Lakes.

A few bighead and grass carp have been captured in Canada's portions of the Great Lakes, but no Asian carp (other than common carp) is known to be established in Canada at this time. Concerns exist that the silver carp may spread into Cypress Hills in Alberta and Saskatchewan through Battle Creek, the Frenchman River, and other rivers flowing south out of the hills into the Milk River. Ontario does not have Asian carp yet and has used the provincial Invasive Species Act to prohibit their import.

In Mexico, grass carp have been established for many years in at least two river systems, where they are considered invasive, but no other Asian carp are known to have been introduced.

Management
These fish are thought to be highly detrimental to the environment in parts of the United States.  Because of these concerns, the U.S. Fish and Wildlife Service convened stakeholders to develop a national plan for the management and control of invasive Asian carp (referring to bighead, silver, black, and grass carp). The plan was accepted by the National Aquatic Nuisance Species Task Force in the fall of 2007.

As of 2016, efforts were being made to reintroduce alligator gar between Tennessee and Illinois as part of an effort to control Asian carp.

In 2019 the Kentucky declared "War on Carp" and started to use electro-fishing and sonic devices to remove 5 million pounds of Asian carp from Lake Barkley and Kentucky Lake.

Legislation
The Stop Asian Carp Act of 2011 was introduced to require the Secretary of the Army to study the feasibility of the hydrological separation, such as electric barriers, of the Great Lakes and Mississippi River basins.  The act provided 30 days for the Secretary of the Army to begin a study on the best means of implementing a hydrological separation of the Great Lakes to prevent the introduction of Asian carp.  The study requirements included researching techniques that prevented the spread of carp from flooding, wastewater and storm water infrastructure, waterway safety operations, and barge and recreational traffic.

In 2012, the U.S. Senate and House introduced new bills aimed at combating the spread of Asian carp into the Great Lakes by expediting some items of the Stop Asian Carp Act of 2011.  The legislation provides direction to the U.S. Army Corps of Engineers to complete their study within 18 months on how to separate the Great Lakes from the Mississippi watersheds.

The Water Resources Development Act of 2020 was passed by Congress to provide $25 million to efforts against the invasive species in the Tennessee and Cumberland river basins.

See also
 Koi

References

Further reading

The Economist, To hook American diners, an invasive species of carp gets a new name (July 7, 2022)
DesignWeek, Asian carp rebranded as Copi to tackle US environmental crisis (June 22, 2022)
Print magazine The Daily Heller, A Misunderstood fish gets a rebrand (July, 2022) 
Illinois Department of Natural Resources official launch with John Goss, Brian Jupiter and Span
Inside Edition: Most Hated Fish in America’ Asian Carp Is Renamed, (August 30, 2022)
Communication Arts: Copi identity and campaign (September 3, 2022)
 Charles V. Stern, Harold F. Upton, Cynthia Brougher, Asian Carp and the Great Lakes Region Congressional Research Service (January 23, 2014)

External links 
 Species Profile- Asian Carp, National Invasive Species Information Center, United States National Agricultural Library.  Lists separate profiles for bighead carp (Hypophthalmichthys nobilis), black carp (Mylopharyngodon piceus), grass carp (Ctenopharyngodon idella), and silver carp (Hypophthalmichthys molitrix)
 AsianCarp.us - multi-agency clearinghouse of information on Asian Carp Response in the Midwest

Carp
Fish common names
Articles containing video clips

th:ปลาจีน